Arthur Edward "Sandy" Patterson (21 March 1916 – 23 May 1997) was an Australian rules footballer who played with South Melbourne in the Victorian Football League (VFL).

Patterson enlisted to serve in the Australian Army during World War II, in late 1940, but contracted measles and was discharged after four months.

Patterson died in May 1997.

Notes

External links 

1916 births
1997 deaths
Australian rules footballers from Victoria (Australia)
Sydney Swans players
Australian Army personnel of World War II
Australian Army soldiers